Mary Spender (born 2 July 1990) is a British singer-songwriter, guitarist and YouTube personality.

Spender writes and performs original songs. Her guitar style has been described as "crisp" with a "harmonically rich, percussive style" and her songwriting as "confessional" and "sultry". Her music has been broadcast on various radio stations including BBC Radio.

Her YouTube channel is themed on music and music technology. It has included interviews with guitarists KT Tunstall, Jen Majura, James Valentine, Devin Townsend, Kaki King, Reina del Cid, and Tomo Fujita. She has also appeared on other YouTube channels such as Andertons, Adam Neely  and That Pedal Show.

Spender was born at the British Military Hospital in Rinteln, Germany, the daughter of a British Army officer. She studied classical music at the University of Bristol, including playing the viola and classical singing.

References

External links
 Official YouTube channel
 

British women singer-songwriters
British women guitarists
Music YouTubers
Musicians from Bristol
Musicians from Brighton and Hove
Living people
Alumni of the University of Bristol
1990 births
People from Rinteln
Musicians from Lower Saxony